Pawnography was an American game show broadcast by History. Hosted by comedian Christopher Titus and featuring Pawn Stars personalities Rick Harrison, Corey Harrison and Austin "Chumlee" Russell as panelists, the series featured two  contestants answering questions for a chance to win cash and items for sale from the Gold and Silver Pawn Shop (where Pawn Stars is recorded). The show premiered July 10, 2014, at 10 p.m. ET, following Pawn Stars and concluded on January 29, 2015.

Episodes

Season 1 (2014)

Season 2 (2014–15)

Gameplay
The game is played in three rounds. In the first round, two contestants compete against Corey and Chumlee, who work together. Titus asks a series of multiple-choice toss-up questions with four answer options; $100 is awarded for each correct answer, and there is no penalty for a miss. If a contestant is in the lead when time runs out, he/she earns the chance to win an item from the shop's collection, revealed at the start of the round. If Corey and Chumlee win the round instead, the item is removed from play and returned to the shop. Rick provides occasional comments on the questions and answers. Any ties for high score between a contestant and Corey/Chumlee are broken in the contestant's favor. If the contestants tie for high score, the item at stake is carried over into the second round.

Titus then asks a $150 bonus question, open only to the contestants and having to do with an item seen in a Pawn Stars episode. The contestants separately choose answers during the commercial break after the first round. For the second round, Rick takes the place of Corey and Chumlee, and their score is transferred to him. All questions in this round are worth $200, and a second item is at stake if a contestant is in the lead at the end. The higher-scoring contestant advances to the third round, while the low scorer is eliminated from the game with no winnings. If the round ends in a tie between the contestants, Titus asks them one last question; the first contestant to answer correctly wins an additional $200 and advances.

In the third round, the surviving contestant faces Rick, Corey, and Chumlee as a team, with a third item at stake. Each side has 60 seconds to answer the same 10 open-ended questions, and must wait in a soundproof isolation booth during the other side's turn. While Corey and Chumlee can suggest answers to Rick, only his responses are counted on behalf of the trio. There is no returning to passed or missed questions, and Titus does not inform either side during the round as to which answers are correct or incorrect. However, an on-screen tally displays the correct answers and scores for the viewer's benefit. He also does not immediately reveal the final scores, instead first giving Rick and the contestant a chance to negotiate an offer (of cash and/or some of the items at stake) for the contestant to walk away from the game. If the contestant turns down Rick's final offer and has out-scored or tied the trio, they win all cash and items accumulated during the first two rounds, as well as the third item; if the trio wins the round, though, the contestant leaves with nothing.

Production
The series was filmed in Las Vegas, Nevada along with Pawn Stars to allow the Harrisons to continue filming Pawn Stars without having to leave the city. The prizes on the show were chosen by the producers with assistance from the shop's CFO, Theo Spyer. According to Harrison, he did not know what items would be offered as prizes until they were revealed on the show; if the prizes were won, the producers would reimburse Harrison for the items, although it was at a large discount. Although the family patriarch, Richard "Old Man" Harrison, was offered a chance to participate, he declined the offer, saying, "I'm 73 years old. I already got a job. I don’t want another one." The series was green-lit on April 30, 2014, with History ordering ten episodes of the show. A second season of the show, which premiered on November 6, was announced on October 7, 2014.

Reception
Diane Werts of Newsday gave the series a "B", saying, "America can't get enough of those Pawn Stars guys... so here they are for another weekly hour, doing what they do."

Ratings
Pawnographys July 10 premiere received 2.82 million viewers as well as 995,000 adults 18–49, making it the highest rated premiere episode of any History original since the beginning of 2014. Among adults 25–54, the series was also among the ten highest rated new summer cable series in 2014.

References

External links

2010s American reality television series
2014 American television series debuts
2010s American game shows
English-language television shows
History (American TV channel) original programming
Pawn Stars
Television shows set in Las Vegas